Shypylivka, also known as Shipilovka is a village in Luhansk Oblast (province) of Ukraine. The village's population is 500 (as of 2001).

Administratively, Shypylivka belongs to the Sievierodonetsk Raion (district) of the oblast as a part of the Bilohorivka local council.

Villages in Sievierodonetsk Raion